Włodzimierz Tylak (born 17 May 1950) is a Polish football manager.

References

1950 births
Living people
Polish football managers
GKS Bełchatów managers
ŁKS Łódź managers
Wisła Płock managers
Widzew Łódź managers
I liga managers